Kanchikacherla is a village in NTR district of the Indian state of Andhra Pradesh. It is located in Kanchikacherla mandal of Nandigama revenue division.

Government and politics 

Kanchikacherla under Kanchikacherla mandal is represented by Nandigama (SC) (Assembly constituency), which in turn represents Vijayawada (Lok Sabha constituency) of Andhra Pradesh. The present MLA representing Nandigama (SC) (Assembly constituency) is Dr.M. JAGAN MOHANARAO of YSRC Party.

People From This Village 
Devineni Venkata Ramana  : ex minister 

Devineni Uma Maheswar Rao : ex minister

Transport
Vijayawada is the nearest town to Kanchikacherla which is approximately 35 KM.

See also 
Villages in Kanchikacherla mandal

References

Villages in Krishna district
Mandal headquarters in Krishna district